United Nations Security Council resolution 1116, adopted unanimously on 27 June 1997, after recalling all resolutions on the situation in Liberia, particularly Resolution 1100 (1997), the Council extended the mandate of the United Nations Observer Mission in Liberia (UNOMIL) until 30 September 1997 with the expectation that it will terminate on that date.

The council noted the decision of the Economic Community of West African States (ECOWAS) to postpone the date of the general election until 19 July 1997. The importance of the elections in the peace process was emphasised and that UNOMIL was mandated to monitor and verify the electoral process in accordance with Resolution 866 (1993).

The Liberian parties were called upon to implement the peace agreements they entered into and for the Liberian people to participate peacefully in the electoral process. At the same time, the assistance of the international community was welcomed and the need for collaboration between the United Nations, ECOWAS, the Liberian National Election Commission and the international community in co-ordinating assistance for the elections was emphasised by the council.

Furthermore, strict compliance with the arms embargo imposed in Resolution 788 (1992) against Liberia by all countries was stressed, with violations reported to the committee established in Resolution 985 (1995). The Secretary-General Kofi Annan was instructed to report to the council on the elections and situation in the country by 29 August 1997. It was the last Security Council resolution concerning the First Liberian Civil War.

See also
 Abuja Accord (Liberia)
 Charles Taylor
 Elections in Liberia
 First Liberian Civil War
 List of United Nations Security Council Resolutions 1101 to 1200 (1997–1998)

References

External links
 
Text of the Resolution at undocs.org

 1116
1997 in Liberia
 1116
June 1997 events